Gardnerina is a genus of flowering plants in the family Asteraceae.

There is only one known species, Gardnerina angustata, endemic to the State of Goiás in Brazil.

References

Eupatorieae
Monotypic Asteraceae genera
Endemic flora of Brazil